Dagur Bergþóruson Eggertsson (born 19 June 1972) is an Icelandic politician who is the Mayor of Reykjavík. He was the vice-chairman of the Social Democratic Alliance from 2009 until 2013. He was first elected to the city council of Reykjavík in a 2002 election and became the mayor on 16 October 2007. Dagur is formally educated as a physician but also has a master's degree in Human Rights and International Law from the University of Lund in Sweden.

Professional career
While studying at the University of Iceland, he was the chairman of the student council from 1994 to 1995 and managing director of the Icelandic Student Innovation Fund from 1995 to 1996. From 1995 to 1998, Dagur worked at the Icelandic National Broadcasting Service, Channel 1, making programs. He is the author of a 3-volume biography of former prime minister, Steingrímur Hermannsson, which he worked on from 1998 to 2000.

From 2000 to 2004, he worked at various divisions at Landspítali University Hospital. He worked as an assistant doctor in the year 2000. He worked as physician at Ísafjörður district hospital in the summer of 2001 and then returned to Landspítali and worked at the Department of Microbiology in 2002. From 2003 to 2004, he was a doctor at the E.R. He held lectures on public health at the Reykjavík University in the years of 2005 to 2007.

Political career
Dagur was first elected to Reykjavík City Council in May 2002 as an Independent candidate within the four party coalition Reykjavíkurlistinn. From 2004–2006 he was the Chairman of the City Planning Council.

Dagur became Mayor of Reykjavík in October 2007 but was suddenly ousted when one of his supporters in the Reykjavík City Council, Ólafur F. Magnússon, changed sides and formed a new majority with the opposition party, becoming mayor himself.

In the years 2009–2013, he was Vice Chairman of the Social Democratic Alliance

In 2010–14, Dagur formed a majority with The Best Party with Jón Gnarr as mayor but Dagur became the chairman of the City Executive Council.

On 31 May 2014, the Social Democratic Alliance in Reykjavík, with Dagur as lead candidate, won the single largest number of votes for the Reykjavík City Council in the 2014 Icelandic municipal elections. Dagur became the mayor of Reykjavík on 16 June 2014.

Personal life
Dagur grew up the Árbær district of Reykjavík. He is the son of Eggert Gunnarsson, a veterinarian, and Bergþóra Jónsdóttir, a biochemist. Dagur is married to Arna Dögg Einarsdóttir, a medical doctor. They have four children.

References

Dagur Bergthoruson Eggertsson
1972 births
Living people
Dagur Bergthoruson Eggertsson
Dagur Bergthoruson Eggertsson